Dugda is a rural locality (a settlement) in Dugdinsky Selsoviet of Zeysky District, Amur Oblast, Russia. The population was 689 as of 2018. There are 11 streets.

Geography 
Dugda is located on the Baikal–Amur Mainline, 286 km southeast of Zeya (the district's administrative centre) by road. Tungala is the nearest rural locality.

References 

Rural localities in Zeysky District